Remake is a 1995 science fiction novel by Connie Willis. It was nominated for the Hugo Award for Best Novel in 1996.

The book displays a dystopic near future, when computer animation and sampling have reduced the movie industry to software manipulation.

References

External links
 Remake at Worlds Without End

1995 American novels
1995 science fiction novels
American science fiction novels
Novels by Connie Willis
Dystopian novels
Novels about actors
Hollywood novels